Maurice-Richard is a provincial electoral district in the Montreal region of Quebec, Canada that elects members to the National Assembly of Quebec. It comprises parts of the Ahuntsic-Cartierville and Montréal-Nord boroughs of the city of Montreal. The riding was known from 1972 to 2018 as Crémazie.

It was created for the 1973 election from parts of Ahuntsic and Bourassa electoral districts.

In the change from the 2001 to the 2011 electoral map, its territory was unchanged.

Members of the National Assembly

Election results

Maurice-Richard

Crémazie

^ CAQ Result compared to Action démocratique

* Result compared to UFP

|}

|-

|Socialist Democracy
|Martine Lauzon
|align="right"|218
|align="right"|0.71
|align="right"|-0.38
|-

|-

|Natural Law
|Denis Cauchon
|align="right"|88
|align="right"|0.29
|align="right"|-0.33
|-

|Innovator
|André Giguère
|align="right"|39
|align="right"|0.13
|align="right"|0.00
|-

|}

|-
 
|Liberal
|Michel Décary
|align="right"|14,053
|align="right"|45.41
|align="right"|-4.79

|-

|New Democratic
|Ginette St-Amour
|align="right"|337
|align="right"|1.09
|align="right"|-0.56
|-

|Natural Law
|Carmel Bernard
|align="right"|193
|align="right"|0.62
|align="right"|–
|-

|-

|Innovator
|Jean Yves Thorne
|align="right"|40
|align="right"|0.13
|align="right"|–
|-
|}

|-

|New Democratic
|Pierre Leduc
|align="right"|765
|align="right"|2.37
|align="right"|–
|-

|Parti indépendantiste
|Louise Crépel
|align="right"|276
|align="right"|0.86
|align="right"|–
|-

|Progressive Conservative
|Laurence Lemyre
|align="right"|233
|align="right"|0.72
|align="right"|–
|-

|Independent
|Carole Caron
|align="right"|211
|align="right"|0.65
|align="right"|–

|-

|Christian Socialist
|Yvan Lauzon
|align="right"|62
|align="right"|0.19
|align="right"|–
|-
|}

|-
 
|Liberal
|Gilles Perron
|align="right"|15,355
|align="right"|46.65
|align="right"|+10.37
|-

|-

|-
|}

|-
 
|Liberal
|Jean Bienvenue
|align="right"|11,851
|align="right"|36.28
|align="right"|-13.90
|-

|-

|-

|-

|-

|NDP – RMS coalition
|André Lavallée 
|align="right"|80
|align="right"|0.25
|align="right"|–
|-
|}

|-

|-

|Parti créditiste
|Jacques Desjardins
|align="right"|783
|align="right"|2.45
|-

|-

|-
|}

References

External links
Information
 Elections Quebec

Election results
 Election results (National Assembly)
 Election results (QuébecPolitique)

Maps
 2011 map (PDF)
 2001 map (Flash)
2001–2011 changes (Flash)
1992–2001 changes (Flash)
 Electoral map of Montréal region
 Quebec electoral map, 2011

Provincial electoral districts of Montreal
Quebec provincial electoral districts
Ahuntsic-Cartierville
Montréal-Nord